Oryzihumus  is a Gram-positive, aerobic and non-motile bacterial genus from the family of Intrasporangiaceae.

References

Intrasporangiaceae
Bacteria genera